Saint Mary's Hall (SMH) is a private college preparatory school in San Antonio, Texas. Saint Mary's Hall admits students from Montessori (age 3) to Form 12.

History
The Episcopal Diocese of Texas, under the leadership of several bishops, worked to establish schools at the parish level where the children of South Texas would be able to receive a “higher style of education” with "Godly training."  The attempts to establish a school of this sort began as early as 1865 when an Episcopal school was opened.  The school took on several names such as Saint Mary's School for Girls, Saint Mary's Episcopal School, Saint Mary's School, and Saint Mary's Academy Hall.  Eventually, the school failed, but it left a strong need for a preparatory school.

The quest to establish that school became very important to Bishop Robert Woodward Barnwell Elliott, the dynamic leader of the Missionary District of Western Texas of the Episcopal Church.  In 1879, he led a movement to reestablish the school.  His efforts would prove successful, and the school officially became known as Saint Mary's Hall.  The first official home of the school was located in the Wolfe Building at the corner of Navarro and Martin streets in downtown San Antonio, Texas.

The reestablishment of Saint Mary's Hall in 1879 came at a time when Texas farmers, cattle barons, and traders were prospering and able to support the school.  Bishop Elliot capitalized on this and set out to hire a leader that would help turn the school into the best educational option available.  He traveled east and began a search for a headmistress.  He hired the first headmistress of the school, Miss Phillippa Stevenson (a graduate of a school in New Jersey also named Saint Mary's Hall).  She served as headmistress of Saint Mary's Hall in Texas for a decade. By 1889, the school had an enrollment of 105 students.

In 1916, due to the decline of the facilities and the growth of the downtown area, the school's new leader, Bishop William Theodotus Capers decided to move the school to a home in the Laurel Heights neighborhood on the corner of San Pedro and Woodlawn.  The home was leased from Mr. D.J. Woodward and was later purchased by the school.  Bishop Capers chose the property because of its “beautiful situation and dignity.”  He wanted to create an environment for Saint Mary's Hall students that was “attractive and inspiring.”

In 1925, Saint Mary's Hall was incorporated as a non-profit educational institution with an independent self-perpetuating Board of Trustees. Not long after, the Board approved the purchase of a larger and more modern facility in the Laurel Heights neighborhood at 117 East French Place which was purchased from Alfred Ward. This location became the school for the next four decades and was sold to San Antonio Academy in 1966. This campus was the home for many years to headmistress, Miss Ruth Coit, who established many of the traditions still held today.

Faced with the need for expansion, the Board of Trustees decided that Saint Mary's Hall should develop a new campus to meet present needs and future demands. In 1964, through funds raised in a $2.38 million capital campaign, the school purchased  at 9401 Starcrest Drive, the school's current location. To design the new campus, the school hired the associated firms of San Antonio architects O'Neil Ford and Bartlett Cocke. The groundbreaking ceremony was held on March 10, 1967, and the campus was occupied on November 22, 1968, by 300 students, including 119 boarding students.

When the firms of O'Neil Ford and Bartlett Cocke were asked to develop the conceptual master plan for the Starcrest Campus, the result was one that drew on Ford's unique Texas Modernist style using natural local materials which would allow his buildings to exist in harmony with the surrounding landscape. Ford designed hundreds of projects throughout Texas from the 1920s to the 1970s, including the distinguishing landmark of the San Antonio skyline, the Tower of the Americas, which he designed for HemisFair '68.

Although Saint Mary's Hall began as an all-girls boarding school, after its move to the Starcrest Campus, the school began to include boys in their educational program through Form 2 for many years. Initially, the Board of Trustees made the decision to expand the coeducational format through Form 6 in order to accommodate male students from The Montessori School who might want to continue their education at Saint Mary's Hall beyond the Montessori years. In 1979, boys were invited to attend the school through Form 8.  And, in 1987, coeducation in the Upper School (Forms 9-12) was fully implemented.

Similarly, since its inception, Saint Mary's Hall had been a boarding school.  As the school grew, school leadership looked to a new direction for long-term sustainability and growth of the school.  At the start of the 2000s, school leadership made the decision to become a day school only.  After much planning, in 2005, the residence dormitories that were reserved for boarding students were converted into classrooms for the Middle School. Soon after, a monument named, Residence Clock, was given to the school in honor of the Saint Mary's Hall boarding students and the Residence Department. The names of three boarding school students are listed on the clock: Frances Dilworth Dilworth ('49), Diane Dilworth Gates ('76), and Thomas Albert Gates, Jr. ('02) as are the names of the dormitories: Abercrombie, Cowles, Meyer, and Murchison.

In the fall of 2010, the school embarked on its second capital campaign … the I AM Saint Mary's Hall campaign, which successfully raised $26 million.  Completed in two years (three years sooner than estimated), the campaign addressed improving, expanding, or building specific facilities that would achieve increased energy efficiency, as well as establishing a reserve fund for the maintenance of the targeted facilities.  By the end of the 2012 - 2013 school year, the I AM Saint Mary's Hall campaign ended with the following accomplishments: the renovation and expansion of the Peggy Pitman Mays Dining Hall, construction of the Social Science & History Center, construction of the new Alonso Ancira Event Center, redesign of the existing McCombs Family Athletic Complex, the renovation of the Coates-Seeligson Theater/Chapel, and the new addition of the Kim & Rod Lewis Track & Field.

In early 2014, Saint Mary's Hall invited the first undocumented immigrant to be admitted to the State Bar of California to be a speaker at their model United Nations conference. However, the school uninvited the speaker, Sergio C. Garcia, when he refused to certify that he was a citizen by signing a W-9 form. Before uninviting Garcia, Saint Mary's Hall had described him as an “experienced and exciting keynote speaker” and had expressing how unfortunate that he had been waiting for a visa for 19 years.

Traditions

Alma Mater
The Saint Mary's Hall alma mater was written by Caroline S. Cummins in 1928, and the music was composed by Mabel C. Osborne. The title was simple, “Alma Mater.”  Later that year, the song was copyrighted by Headmistress Ruth Coit. Nowadays students don't sing as much but it is technically still in use.

Blue Tie Ceremony
The first Blue Tie Ceremony was held on September 10, 1940, when the first blue ties were awarded to the Class of 1941. This ceremony is a rite of passage for seniors and occurs during the first week of the new school year. It is during this ceremony that members of the senior class are presented with their class rings and blue ties (to be worn with their uniforms). Today, this special event includes a convocation event with the entire school in attendance; a parade where seniors celebrate their transition from juniors to seniors; and the Blue Tie Ceremony (where the ties are awarded to seniors).

Capers & Elliott
In the fall of 1925, Headmistress Ruth Coit organized an athletic association in the Upper School, and two intramural teams were formed: Elliott and Capers, named in honor of two of the school's most influential leaders ... Bishop Elliott and Bishop Capers. Almost a hundred years later, students and faculty continue to participate in the sorting ceremony, where they are assigned to one of the two teams.  The sorting ceremony typically happens during the first week of school, and students remain on their team throughout their time in the Upper School. Today's Capers and Elliott team captains are still elected by the student body, and the teams compete throughout the year, including at the annual Bishops’ Day.

Chapel
In 1879, Saint Mary's Hall was founded as an Episcopalian school. Today, the school maintains many Christian-based traditions but doesn't seek to promote or favor one faith over another. Each division gathers for a time of worship and reflection each Monday in order to be inspired through music, scripture readings, and stories of faith & service.  Guest speakers present frequently at the Upper & Middle School chapels on a variety of topics.

La Reata
In 1928, the first edition of the Saint Mary's Hall yearbook, La Reata, was published with a foreword written by Headmistress Ruth Coit. Among other things, this first yearbook reported on the newly formed “Stir Up Club,” which had been formed to promote equestrian riding at Saint Mary's Hall and had succeeded in “winning first prize in the Battle of Flowers with their Cavalcade.”

School Mascot
Saint Mary's Hall was “mascot-less” from 1879 until 1970. During the 1970-1971 school year, references indicate that the mascot was a Bobcat.  Over the years, other mascots have come and gone including Snoopy from the Peanuts cartoon.

In 2009, a committee of students from the Upper and Middle Schools was formed to determine and define who the SMH Baron really was and what he embodied to today's students. Today's Baron is a warrior that is symbolic of "inner toughness, grit, and determination."

School Motto
The Saint Mary's Hall motto, “Teach us delight in simple things” first appeared on the French Place campus where it was set in bronzed lettering in the stone steps of the school building.  In 1968, the bronze lettering was moved to the Starcrest Campus (at the front entrance to the Administration Building) from the French Place campus.

School Ties

Saint Mary's Hall students wear “ties” to signify their leadership roles in different organizations around the school. 
 
Upper School
 Blue Tie – Seniors 
 Red Tie – Student Council 
 Yellow Tie – Sports Council 
 Green Tie – Community Service Council 
 White Tie – Fine Arts Council 
 Maroon Tie – Honor Council

Middle School
 Teal Tie – Community Service Council 
 Orange Tie – Bailey Intramural Team 
 Green Tie – Bennett Intramural Team 
 Maroon Tie – Student Senate

Uniforms
Saint Mary's Hall students wear uniforms to school.  This tradition can be traced back to when the school began.  Students wear formal dress uniforms to school every Monday and for special occasions such as Blue Tie Ceremony.  The girls’ dress uniform consists of a white skirt, white middy blouse, and tie.  The boys wear khaki slacks, a white dress shirt, black blazer, and tie. During the week the girls wear a black pleated skirt, white middy blouse, and tie (females may have the choice of wearing the males white polo as of August 2021), while boys wear khaki slacks and a white polo shirt.

Athletics
Students can choose to participate in any of the 14 men's and women's sports offered throughout the year. The SMH Athletic department staff is made up of more than 60 coaches, a certified athletic trainer, and a strength and conditioning coach.

Lower School students compete in community leagues playing soccer and basketball. Middle School students compete in the Independent School Athletic League with schools from San Antonio and the surrounding area. Upper School students compete in the Texas Association of Private and Parochial Schools (TAPPS).

Over the years, more than 50 students have been named All-Area Private School Athletes by the San Antonio Express-News, and more than 25 students have earned national awards from governing bodies.
Additionally, many students choose to continue to participate competitively in athletics during college.

Fine Arts
The Tobin Fine Arts School at Saint Mary's Hall offers five programs:  Dance, Drama/Speech & Debate, Media Arts, Music, and Visual Arts. Students and faculty, who are artists themselves, have access to thousands of square feet of dedicated art space (including multiple performance areas, media labs, a photography center, an art studio with kilns, a music hall, and rooms for private practice and instruction).

Curriculum
The academic curriculum at Saint Mary's Hall is a mixture of English, Fine Arts, Mathematics, Science, Social Studies, and World Languages. The faculty attends (and is encouraged to seek out) professional enrichment opportunities in their subject areas to ensure students are learning from the most up-to-date curriculum and in the newest ways. Many faculty members also lead these professional enrichment programs for their peers at conferences around the state of the Texas and the country.

In the Upper School, SMH offers 20 Advanced Placement (AP) courses, and the student body takes 568 AP exams annually, on average. Averages based on 2012-2016 graduation statistics.

Distinctive Programs
Saint Mary's Hall offers students experiences and programs. Students are exposed to world religions in Chapel, meet one-on-one with their college counselor, or help plan the annual Issues Day debate. A list of SMH's distinctive programs is below: 
 Chapel
 College Counseling
 Study Abroad Opportunities
 Student Enrichment
 Investing in Our Faculty
 Responsible Decision Making
 Community Events
 Campus Technology

Accreditation 
Saint Mary's Hall is accredited by the Independent Schools Association of the Southwest (ISAS), a member of the NAIS Commission on Accreditation. Saint Mary's Hall is also a member of the following national and regional organizations:
 American Montessori Society
 College Board
 Educational Records Bureau (ERB)
 National Association for College Admission Counseling (NACAC)
 National Association of Independent Schools (NAIS)
 Independent Schools Association of the Southwest (ISAS)
 Southwest Preparatory Conference (SPC)
 Secondary School Admission Test Board (SSATB)

References

External links
Official web site
San Antonio Private Schools.com
Great Schools.org

High schools in San Antonio
Private K-12 schools in Texas
Preparatory schools in Texas
Independent Schools Association of the Southwest
1879 establishments in Texas